Viktoriya Tymoshenkova (born 4 November 1983) is a Ukrainian handball player who plays as a goalkeeper for Liga Națională club Corona Brașov and the Ukrainian national team.

Achievements 

Women's EHF Cup:
Semifinalist: 2009
Women's EHF Cup Winners' Cup:
Semifinalist: 2012
 Russian Super League: 
Winner: 2009, 2010, 2011, 2012
 Carpathian Trophy:
2nd Place: 2008
3rd Place: 2010,  2012
 Romanian Cup:
2nd Place:  2016
 Romanian Super Cup:
2nd Place:  2016
GF World Cup:
Semifinalist:  2006

References

 

1983 births
Living people
Ukrainian female handball players
Expatriate handball players
Ukrainian expatriate sportspeople in Romania
Ukrainian expatriate sportspeople in Russia
Ukrainian expatriate sportspeople in Turkey